Camila Merino Catalán is an industrial engineer and former Minister of Labor and Social Welfare for Chile. Currently is Mayor of Vitacura.

Early life
Merino completed her studies in Colegio Alianza Francesa in Concepción, Chile.   She completed her university studies in Pontifical Catholic University of Chile and majored in Industrial Engineering. She holds an MBA from the MIT Sloan School of Management.  She also completed studies at the Institut d'Études Politiques de Paris.  She is married to Enrique Elsaca Hirmas, Vice-President of Services and Operations of LAN Airlines.

Career
In 1991 she began working as an executive for Sociedad Química y Minera de Chile (SQM), where she remained for the next 16 years.  Amongst her positions, she was Vice-president of Administration Manager of Corporate Services, Human Resources and Mining.  For her functions in the mining company, she worked for several years in Antofagasta, where she was director of the Association of Local Industries.  The headhunter Humanitas selected her as a candidate for General Manager of Santiago Metro in December 2007, position which she accepted.  She worked on a project—which had not had a manager for over a year—with a budget of nearly 1 billion USD to extend lines 1 and 5 of the subway.Politics
In February 2010, she was nominated by Chile’s President-elect Sebastián Piñera as Minister of Labor and Social Forecast.''

References

Chilean civil engineers
Government ministers of Chile
Living people
MIT Sloan School of Management alumni
People from Concepción, Chile
Pontifical Catholic University of Chile alumni
Women government ministers of Chile
Chilean women engineers
Evópoli politicians
1967 births